Chloe Caldwell (born 29 June 1988) is an Australian rugby league footballer who played for the Sydney Roosters in the NRL Women's Premiership. 

Playing career
In 2005 and 2006, while playing for the Redfern All Blacks, Caldwell represented New South Wales. In 2010, she represented both Australia and New South Wales.

In 2011, Caldwell represented the Indigenous All Stars in the inaugural women's NRL All Stars game.

In May 2018, while playing for the South Sydney Rabbitohs in the NSWRL Women's Premiership, Caldwell represented NSW City at the Women's National Championships. 

In September 2018, Caldwell joined the Sydney Roosters NRL Women's Premiership team. In Round 1 of the 2018 NRL Women's season, she made her debut for the Roosters in their 4–10 loss to the New Zealand Warriors.

References

External links
South Sydney Rabbitohs profile

1988 births
Living people
Indigenous Australian rugby league players
Australian female rugby league players
Australia women's national rugby league team players
Rugby league props
Sydney Roosters (NRLW) players